Desmomys is a genus of rodent in the family Muridae endemic to Ethiopia. It contains the following species:

Harrington's rat, D. harringtoni
Yalden's rat, D. yaldeni

References

 
Taxa named by Oldfield Thomas
Rodent genera
Taxonomy articles created by Polbot